Siberia and Him is a Russian-language gay-themed film written, directed, edited, produced by and starring Viatcheslav Kopturevskiy.  It is his feature-length film debut.  Siberia and Him premiered at the 2019 NewFest film festival.

Plot

Dima, a policeman, and Sasha, a farm-hand, both live in a run-down town in Siberia where the local police make guerrilla-like raids against the local gay scene.  The movie begins by showing Sasha attempting to commit suicide by hanging himself, which he fails to do successfully.  Sasha is involved with Dima, his brother-in-law, in a secret relationship, which creates a secret tension between the two characters in their small town.  When Sasha fails to contact his grandmother in a far-away village, Dima accompanies him on a days-long trek to see to Sasha's grandmother's well-being.  During their days-long journey, much naturalistic cinematography is used to evoke the Siberian countryside.  They reach their destination and see to Sasha's grandmother's well-being.  Afterwards, Sasha and Dima during their return trek have a fight where Dima kills Sasha.  Dima returns to his native village and eventually commits suicide.

Cast
 Viatcheslav Kopturevsky as Sasha
 Ilya Shubochkin as Dima
 Anastasia Voskresenskaya as Anna
 Irina Novokreshennuh as Mother

Critical reception

The few independent critical reviews of the film have been generally positive.  Jennie Kermode, in her 3.5 star (out of 5) review, writing for the website Eye for Film states "Stunningly beautiful cinematography dominates a film in which the dialogue is sparse...(Kopturevskiy's) style is observational, quiet, but the emotion we see is raw".  Roger Walker-Dack, writing for Queerguru.com calls the film "an excellent, heart-wrenching drama". In the official write-up for the film on NewFest's website, the film is described as being an "auspicious debut drama...an elliptical and much-needed examination of internalized homophobia, repression, and identity in a remote Siberian town".

References

External links
 
 Official website
 Director's official website

2019 films
Russian drama films
Russian independent films
2010s Russian-language films
Russian LGBT-related films
Films set in Siberia
2019 LGBT-related films
2019 drama films
2019 independent films
LGBT-related drama films